The NWL Tag Team Championship is a professional wrestling tag team championship in the National Wrestling League promotion. The Brothers Superior (Neil Superior and Doug Superior) defeated The Cream Team (Dino Casanova and Rip Sawyer) in Moorefield, West Virginia in 1989 to become the first champions. The title is defended primarily in the Mid-Atlantic and East Coast, most often in Hagerstown, Maryland, but also in Pennsylvania and West Virginia. There are 34 recognized known teams with a total of 50 title reigns.

Title history

References

Tag team wrestling championships